Derhachi urban hromada is a hromada (municipality) of Ukraine, in Kharkiv Raion of Kharkiv Oblast. The administrative center is the city of Derhachi. Population: 

Until 18 July 2020, the hromada belonged to Derhachi Raion. The raion was abolished in July 2020 as part of the administrative reform of Ukraine, which reduced the number of raions or districts in the Kharkiv Oblast to seven. The area of Derhachi Raion was merged into Kharkiv Raion.

References 

Hromadas of Kharkiv Oblast